The following is a list of ecoregions in Gambia, according to the Worldwide Fund for Nature (WWF).

Terrestrial ecoregions
By major habitat type:

Tropical and subtropical grasslands, savannas, and shrublands

Guinean forest-savanna mosaic
West Sudanian savanna

Mangrove

Guinean mangroves

Freshwater ecoregions
By bioregion:

Nilo-Sudan
Senegal-Gambia

Marine ecoregions
 Sahelian upwelling

References
 Burgess, Neil, Jennifer D’Amico Hales, Emma Underwood (2004). Terrestrial Ecoregions of Africa and Madagascar: A Conservation Assessment. Island Press, Washington DC.
 Spalding, Mark D., Helen E. Fox, Gerald R. Allen, Nick Davidson et al. "Marine Ecoregions of the World: A Bioregionalization of Coastal and Shelf Areas". Bioscience Vol. 57 No. 7, July/August 2007, pp. 573–583. 
 Thieme, Michelle L. (2005). Freshwater Ecoregions of Africa and Madagascar: A Conservation Assessment. Island Press, Washington DC.

Ecoregions of the Gambia
ecoregions
Gambia